The Highway of Hope is a lost 1917 American Western silent film directed by Howard Estabrook and written by Harvey Gates and Willard Mack. The film stars House Peters, Sr., Kathlyn Williams, Jim Farley and Harry De Vere. The film was released on May 17, 1917, by Paramount Pictures.

Plot

Cast 
 House Peters, Sr. as Steve King
 Kathlyn Williams as Lonely Lou
 Jim Farley as Missouri Joe
 Harry De Vere as Philip Garst

References

External links 
 

1917 films
1917 Western (genre) films
1917 lost films
American black-and-white films
Lost American films
Lost Western (genre) films
Paramount Pictures films
Silent American Western (genre) films
1910s English-language films
1910s American films